The Darwin–Wallace Medal is a medal awarded by the Linnean Society of London for "major advances in evolutionary biology". Historically, the medals have been awarded every 50 years, beginning in 1908.  That year marked 50 years after the joint presentation by Charles Darwin and Alfred Russel Wallace of two scientific papers—On the Tendency of Species to form Varieties; and on the Perpetuation of Varieties and Species by Natural Means of Selection—to the Linnean Society of London on 1 July 1858. Fittingly, Wallace was one of the first recipients of the medal, in his case it was, exceptionally, in gold, rather than the silver version presented in the six other initial awards. However, in 2008 the Linnean Society announced that due to the continuing importance of evolutionary research, the medal will be awarded on an annual basis beginning in 2010.

Awardees

1908 

The first award was of a gold medal to Alfred Russel Wallace, and silver medals to six other distinguished scientists:

Joseph Dalton Hooker
August Weismann
Ernst Haeckel
Francis Galton
E. Ray Lankester
Eduard Strasburger

1958 
20 silver medals were awarded:

Edgar Anderson
E. Pavlovsky
Maurice Caullery
Bernhard Rensch
Ronald A. Fisher
G. Gaylord Simpson
C. R. Florin
Carl Skottsberg
Roger Heim
H. Hamshaw Thomas
J. B. S. Haldane
Erik Stensiö
John Hutchinson
Göte Turesson
Julian Huxley
Victor van Straelen
Ernst Mayr
D. M. S. Watson
H. J. Muller
John Christopher Willis (posthumously)

2008 
13 silver medals were awarded, including 2 posthumously:

Nick Barton
M.W. Chase
 Bryan Clarke
 Joseph Felsenstein
 Stephen Jay Gould (posthumously)
 Peter R. Grant
 Rosemary Grant
 James Mallet
 Lynn Margulis
 John Maynard Smith (posthumously)
 Mohamed Noor
 H. Allen Orr
 Linda Partridge

From 2010 
 Brian Charlesworth (2010)
 James A. Lake (2011)
 Loren H. Rieseberg (2012)
 Godfrey Hewitt (2013)
 Dolph Schluter (2014)
 Roger Butlin (2015)
 Pamela S. Soltis and Douglas E. Soltis (2016)
 John N. Thompson (2017)
 Josephine Pemberton (2018)
 David Reich and Svante Pääbo (2019)
 Spencer Barrett (2020)
 Sarah Otto (2021)
 David Jablonski (2022)

See also

 List of biology awards

References 

Biology awards
British science and technology awards
Linnean Society of London